The II Corps of the Ottoman Empire (Turkish: 2 nci Kolordu or İkinci Kolordu) was one of the corps of the Ottoman Army. It was formed in the early 20th century during Ottoman military reforms.

Formation

Order of Battle, 1911 
With further reorganizations of the Ottoman Army, to include the creation of corps level headquarters, by 1911 the II Corps was headquartered in Tekfur Dağı. The Corps before the First Balkan War in 1911 was structured as such:

II Corps, Harbiye, Tekfur Dağı (Mirliva Şevket Turgut Pasha)
4th Infantry Division, Tekfur Dağı (Mirliva Hıfzı Pasha)
10th Infantry Regiment, Tekfur Dağı
11th Infantry Regiment, Tekfur Dağı
12th Infantry Regiment, Hayrabolu
4th Rifle Battalion, Tekfur Dağı
4th Field Artillery Regiment, Tekfur Dağı
4th Division Band, Tekfur Dağı
5th Infantry Division, Gallipoli
16th Infantry Regiment, Gallipoli
17th Infantry Regiment, Malkara
18th Infantry Regiment, Uzunköprü
5th Rifle Battalion, Gallipoli
5th Field Artillery Regiment, Constantinople
5th Division Band, Gallipoli
6th Infantry Division, Smyrna (Miralay Şevki)
16th Infantry Regiment, Smyrna
17th Infantry Regiment, Yemen
18th Infantry Regiment, Sakız
6th Rifle Battalion, Sisam
6th Field Artillery Regiment, Constantinople
6th Division Band, Smyrna
Units of II Corps
2nd Rifle Regiment, Yemen
2nd Field Howitzer Battalion, Şam
2nd Engineer Battalion, Adrianople
2nd Telegraph Battalion, Adrianople
2nd Transport Battalion, Constantinople
2nd Medical Battalion, Constantinople
Dardanelles Fortified Area Command, Çanakkale
3rd Heavy Artillery Regiment, Çanakkale
4th Heavy Artillery Regiment, Çanakkale
5th Heavy Artillery Regiment, Çanakkale
Independent Heavy Artillery Regiment, Çanakkale
Torpedo Detachment, Çanakkale
Mine Detachment, Çanakkale
Wireless Detachment, Çanakkale

Balkan Wars

Order of Battle, October 17, 1912 
On October 17, 1912, the corps was structured as follows:

II Corps (Thrace, under the command of the Eastern Army)
4th Division, 3rd Division
Uşak Redif Division

Order of Battle, October 19, 1912 
On October 19, 1912, the corps was structured as follows:

II Provisional Corps (Serbian Front, under the command of the Vardar Army of the Western Army)
Uşak Redif Division, Denizli Redif Division, Smyrna Redif Division

Order of Battle, October 29, 1912 
On October 29, 1912, the corps was structured as follows:

II Corps (Thrace, under the command of the First Eastern Army)
4th Division, 5th Division,
Kastamonu Redif Division

Order of Battle, November 17, 1912 
On November 17, 1912, the corps was structured as follows:

II Corps (Thrace, under the command of the Chataldja Army)
4th Division, 5th Division, 12th Division
South Wing Detachment
II Provisional Reserve Corps
30th Division,
Amasya Redif Division, Yozgat Redif Division, Samsun Redif Division

Order of Battle, March 25, 1913 
On March 25, 1913, the corps was structured as follows:

II Corps (Thrace, under the command of the Chataldja Army)
5th Division, 12th Division
Ankara Redif Division
II Provisional Reserve Corps
Selimiye Redif Division, Aydın Redif Division, Samsun Redif Division

Order of Battle, July 1913
II Corps (Thrace)
3rd Division, 5th Division, 12th Division

World War I

Order of Battle, August 1914, November 1914, Late April 1915 
In  August 1914, November 1914, Late April 1915, the corps was structured as follows:

II Corps (Thrace)
4th Division, 5th Division, 6th Division

Order of Battle, Late Summer 1915, January 1916
In late Summer 1915, January 1916, the corps was structured as follows:

II Corps (Gallipoli)
4th Division, 5th Division, 6th Division

Order of Battle, August 1916 
In August 1916, the corps was structured as follows:

II Corps (Caucasus)
11th Division, 12th Division

Order of Battle, December 1916 
In December 1916, the corps was structured as follows:

II Corps (Caucasus)
1st Division, 47th Division

Order of Battle, August 1917 
In August 1917, the corps was structured as follows:

II Corps (Caucasus)
1st Division, 42nd Division

Order of Battle, September 1918 
In September 1918, the corps was structured as follows:

II Corps (Palestine)
62nd Division, Provisional Infantry Division x 3

Sources

Corps of the Ottoman Empire
Military units and formations of the Ottoman Empire in the Balkan Wars
Military units and formations of the Ottoman Empire in World War I
1911 establishments in the Ottoman Empire